Blue Eyed Kentucky Girl is a compilation album by American country singer-songwriter Loretta Lynn. It was released in 1985 via MCA Records and was produced by Owen Bradley. The album included ten previously-recorded hits by Lynn during a fifteen-year time span. All of the album's recordings were first cut on MCA/Decca Records.

Background, release and reception
Blue Eyed Kentucky Girl was part of a series of compilations MCA released by Loretta Lynn during the 1980s. A total of ten tracks were included on the album package. The songs chosen were recorded in sessions over a fifteen-year time-span between 1964 and 1980. Eight of the album's tracks had been among Lynn's biggest hits in her career. This included signature songs, such as "Coal Miner's Daughter"(1970), "You're Lookin' at Country" (1971) and "The Pill." Also included were other hits, such as "Somebody Led Me Away" (1981) and "The Home You're Tearing Down" (1965). All of the album's sessions had originally been produced by Owen Bradley, Lynn's long-time producer at MCA.

Blue Eyed Kentucky Girl had first been released in 1985 via MCA Records. It was offered as both a compact disc and an audio cassette. It was later released again On November 15, 1995 via Universal Special Products on a cassette. The album did not reach any peak positions on any music publication charts, including Billboard. It also did not spawn any singles to radio. The album was reviewed by Hank Small of Allmusic following its re-release: "Blue Eyed Kentucky Girl assembles ten tracks from Loretta Lynn's 1970s recordings for RCA [MCA], perhaps the singer's most creatively fertile period."

Track listing

CD version

Cassette version

Personnel
All credits are adapted from the liner notes of Blue Eyed Kentucky Girl.

Musical and technical personnel
 Owen Bradley – producer
 Steve Hoffman – compiled credits
 Loretta Lynn – lead vocals, harmony vocals

Release history

References

1985 compilation albums
Albums produced by Owen Bradley
Loretta Lynn compilation albums
MCA Records compilation albums